Citra Raya Tangerang is the largest integrated city developed by the Ciputra Group at Cikupa and Panongan of Tangerang Regency in Indonesia, which is located about 40 km from the capital Jakarta. The township is within Greater Jakarta and has a land area of about 2,760 hectares. Development of the township began in 1994. Population of the township is over 65,000.

The township has three separate CBD with shopping centers, apartments and office towers.

Infrastructures
The township is growing very rapidly. There are 54 residential clusters, over 2000 shop-houses and commercial buildings in the township at present. Ciputra Hospital is the only specialized health facility in the township. There is Amaris Hotel within the township. A Mal Ciputra is also located in the township.

Educational Institutions
Universitas Esa Unggul
TK Mutiara Bangsa - elementary school
Sekolah Citra Islami - private Islamic school
Sekolah Tarakanita - elementary and high school
Sekolah Citra Berkat
Gita Bangsa School - elementary school
 Gita Bangsa School - kindergarten

Sports and Recreation
Water World Citra Raya
World of Wonders Citra Raya- theme park
Citra Raya Eco Club
Citra Raya sports club

Retail and shopping
ECO Plaza- shopping mall
Citraraya Food Festival - food park
Informa
Ace Hardware
Ruko Citra Raya - shop-house cluster

Transportation
The township can be reached by Jakarta-Merak Toll Road. Shuttle bus service Trans Citra Raya connects the township with different areas of Jakarta city center.

See also
Tangerang Regency
Jabodetabek

External links

References

Tangerang Regency
Populated places in Banten
Planned townships in Indonesia
Post-independence architecture of Indonesia